Battersea is a constituency in the London Borough of Wandsworth. It has been represented since 2017 by Marsha de Cordova of the Labour Party.

The seat has had two periods of existence (1885–1918 and 1983 to date). In the first Parliament after the seat's re-creation it was Labour-represented, bucking the national result, thereafter from 1987 until 2017 the affiliation of the winning candidate was that of the winning party nationally – a 30-year bellwether.

In the 2016 referendum to leave the European Union, the constituency voted remain by an estimated 77%, the highest by a constituency with a Conservative MP at the time.

Boundaries

1885–1918: Wards 2 and 3 of Battersea Parish, and that part of No. 4 Ward bounded on the south by Battersea Rise, and on the east by St John's Road.

1983–2010: The London Borough of Wandsworth wards of Balham, Fairfield, Latchmere, Northcote, Queenstown, St John, St Mary's Park and Shaftesbury.

St John Ward was abolished for the 2002 Wandsworth elections.
 St John was thus not in use at the next general election in 2005.

For that general election, the seat included a small part of Wandsworth Town (the majority being in Tooting constituency) and most of Fairfield (a small part being in Putney).

2010–present: The London Borough of Wandsworth wards of Balham, Fairfield, Latchmere, Northcote, Queenstown, St Mary's Park and Shaftesbury.

The seat covers the north-eastern third of the London Borough of Wandsworth. As drawn and redrawn since 1983, it includes central Wandsworth and in the same way as Chelsea on the opposite bank, it adjoins the Thames before it flows through central London.

It takes in all of the district of Battersea, including its large Battersea Park (which hosts frequent live entertainment events and seasonal festivals), riverside and London Heliport, and stretches eastwards to include Nine Elms. Surrounding Battersea Park, it includes Queenstown, large neighbourhoods of Battersea Town, and, going westwards, it includes most of Wandsworth town, including the riverside, Town Hall and East Hill. Battersea also stretches south between Wandsworth Common and Clapham Common to include Balham Ward and the eastern end of Balham (the west, for general elections, being placed since 1983 in Tooting).

Constituency profile

A largely residential and ethnically diverse inner-city district of south London, the seat of Battersea includes half of Clapham Common, along with parts of Balham and Wandsworth. The iconic Battersea Power Station along with Nine Elms and the Patmore Estate. Battersea Power Station dominates the skyline, while Clapham Junction continues to be the busiest railway interchange in the UK.

Thanks to the influx of commuters, the constituency's social and demographic profile has changed considerably over the last quarter of a century. At 57.4%, it has the highest proportion of people with a degree-level qualification or above amongst constituencies in England and Wales, according to Office for National Statistics 2011 Census figures. More than one in five has an associate professional and technical occupation.

A former bellwether seat, Battersea's winner came from the winning party from the 1987 to the 2015 general elections inclusive.

History

Major events

The Redistribution of Seats Act 1885 provided that the Constituency was to consist of-
"No. 2 Ward of Battersea Parish,
No. 3 Ward of Battersea Parish, and
So much of No. 4 Ward of Battersea Parish as lies to the north of a line drawn along the centre of Battersea Rise, and to the west of a line drawn along the centre of the St. John's Road."

Battersea constituency was originally created in 1885.  From 1892 to 1918 the seat was held by trade union leader John Burns who served as a Minister (of the Crown) in the Liberal Cabinets of Sir Henry Campbell-Bannerman and H. H. Asquith from 1905 until 1914.

The constituency was split in 1918 into:
Battersea North, which included the cheap housing accompanying Battersea Power Station and railway-works focussed Nine Elms; it saw gradual replacement in its lifespan to overcrowded terraces, and had only four years of a Conservative MP (from 1931).
Battersea South had average-middle income and few pockets of slum clearance. It saw 38 years of a Conservative MP, lastly from 1959 to 1964, without electing one during new latter-day Conservative governments which came to power in 1970 and 1979.

The two seats have been rejoined since 1983, such that some areas of Battersea South became part of the adjoining Tooting seat. Alf Dubs (Labour), before the election the incumbent for Battersea South, won Battersea in 1983. Conservative John Bowis won in the next elections, 1987 and 1992. Martin Linton, a Labour politician, took it back in 1997 and held the seat until 2010.

Minor events including in the split of this constituency period

In 2001, the candidate T.E Barber used the candidate description "No fruit out of context party", and advocated the end of, amongst other crimes against food, pineapples on pizza.

In the book Things Can Only Get Better: Eighteen Miserable Years in the Life of a Labour Supporter, John O'Farrell describes his experiences of being the secretary of Queenstown Branch of the Battersea Labour party, during which time the branch suffered a net loss at every local election and lost in 1987 their MP, Alf Dubs.

Benefiting from an exclusivity arrangement, the old Battersea North was one of two seats in London to have had a Communist MP: Shapurji Saklatvala represented the area from 1922 to 1929. A wealthy aristocratic Indian, he was among the five Communists elected to the national chamber in its history and was the third of the young Socialist Labour/Communist/Labour parties from an ethnic minority background. At first, Saklatvala had local Labour party support and was also a member of that party but then stood as a Communist in 1924 with local Labour party backing. The head office of the less radical Labour party mandated an official Labour candidate stand against him in 1929. The Battersea Labour Club (a drinking club not directly connected with the political party) had a notice on its notice board up until the 1980s banning Communists from admission to the club.

Members of Parliament

Elections

Elections in the 2010s

Elections in the 2000s

Elections in the 1990s

Elections in the 1980s

Elections in the 1970s

1979 notional Battersea result (new seat created post-election)

Elections in the 1910s

Elections in the 1900s

Elections in the 1890s

Elections in the 1880s

Morgan sought re-election after questions arose about a government contract his firm held.

See also
 List of parliamentary constituencies in London

Notes

References

Further reading
 British Parliamentary Election Results 1885–1918, compiled and edited by F.W.S. Craig (Macmillan Press 1974)
 Debrett’s Illustrated Heraldic and Biographical House of Commons and the Judicial Bench 1886
 Debrett’s House of Commons and the Judicial Bench 1901
 Debrett’s House of Commons and the Judicial Bench 1918

External links 
Politics Resources (Election results from 1922 onwards)
Electoral Calculus (Election results from 1955 onwards)

Battersea
Parliamentary constituencies in London
Politics of the London Borough of Wandsworth
Constituencies of the Parliament of the United Kingdom established in 1885
Constituencies of the Parliament of the United Kingdom disestablished in 1918
Constituencies of the Parliament of the United Kingdom established in 1983